Rob Mundle OAM is an Australian yachtsman, maritime commentator and author.

He is the author of some 19 books, six of which have become best sellers, including Captain James Cook: from Sailor to Legend; Fatal Storm: The 54th Sydney to Hobart Yacht Race; Bligh: Master Mariner; and Flinders: The Man Who Mapped Australia. Since publishing those biographies Mundle is regarded as a contemporary authority on James Cook, William Bligh and Mathew Flinders.

Mundle began sailing as a boy. After finishing school he became a cadet journalist at The Australian newspaper, which led to a career as a noted nautical commentator in print, radio and television and to him becoming known as 'the voice of sailing'.

Since the 1980s he has covered the America's Cup, sailing in the Olympics and the Sydney to Hobart Yacht Race, on which he is regarded as an authority.

Mundle is credited with introducing the Laser and J24 class boats into Australia. From 2011 to 2013 he was Commodore of Southport Yacht Club.  

In 2000 Mundle was award the Australian Sports Medal for services to sailing in the media; and in 2013 was awarded the Order of Australia Medal (OAM) for services to sailing and to journalism.

Selected bibliography

References 

Living people
Year of birth missing (living people)
Australian writers
Maritime writers
Recipients of the Medal of the Order of Australia
Australian maritime historians